Anglers Reach is a village in New South Wales, Australia in Snowy Monaro Regional Council. It is on the shores of Lake Eucumbene near Adaminaby.

Climate
Lake Eucumbene has mild, stormy summers and cold, wet winters; with a largely uniform rainfall pattern, peaking somewhat in late winter and springtime. Frosts occur regularly during autumn, winter and spring, and can occur also in summer. Snowfall can occur at any time of the year, save for high summer.

References

Towns in New South Wales
Snowy Monaro Regional Council